Fahad Al-Rashidi (born 31 December 1984) is a Kuwaiti football player. He currently plays for Kuwaiti Premier League side Al-Fahaheel.

International career

International goals
Scores and results list Kuwait's goal tally first.

Personal life
Fahad younger brother, Khalid, was another footballer and also played for Al Tadhamon, Al-Arabi and Al-Salmiya.

References

External links
 

1984 births
Living people
Sportspeople from Kuwait City
Kuwaiti footballers
Kuwaiti expatriate footballers
Kuwait international footballers
Association football forwards
Al-Hazem F.C. players
Al Salmiya SC players
Al-Karamah players
Al-Orouba SC players
Al-Arabi SC (Kuwait) players
Al-Nasr SC (Kuwait) players
Kuwait Premier League players
Saudi Professional League players
Syrian Premier League players
Oman Professional League players
Expatriate footballers in Saudi Arabia
Expatriate footballers in Syria
Expatriate footballers in Oman
Kuwaiti expatriate sportspeople in Saudi Arabia
Kuwaiti expatriate sportspeople in Syria
Kuwaiti expatriate sportspeople in Oman
Al Tadhamon SC players